Koroop is a locality situated in Victoria, Australia. At the 2016 census, Koroop had a population of 80.

References

Towns in Victoria (Australia)